The 1938 Illinois Fighting Illini football team was an American football team that represented the University of Illinois during the 1938 Big Ten Conference football season.  In their 26th season under head coach Robert Zuppke, the Illini compiled a 3–5 record and finished in seventh place in the Big Ten Conference. Guard James Hodges was selected as the team's most valuable player.

Schedule

References

Illinois
Illinois Fighting Illini football seasons
Illinois Fighting Illini football